The Crealock 37, also called the Pacific Seacraft 37, is an American sailboat that was designed by British naval architect W. I. B. Crealock as a cruiser and first built in 1978.

In 2002, the boat was admitted to the American Sailboat Hall of Fame.

Production
The design was initially commissioned and intended to be built by Clipper Marine in the United States, as the Clipper Marine 37, but the company went out of business before production commenced.

In 1978 the design was produced by Cruising Consultants Inc. of Newport Beach, California, under the name Crealock 37.

In 1980 the design was acquired and put into production by Pacific Seacraft of Washington, North Carolina as the Pacific Seacraft 37 and it remained in production in 2020.

Design
The Crealock 37 is a recreational keelboat, built predominantly of fiberglass, with a plywood core, with wood trim. It has a masthead sloop rig, with an  optional cutter rig or yawl rig, with a mizzen mast. It features a raked stem, a raised canoe transom, a skeg-mounted rudder controlled by a wheel and a fixed fin keel. It displaces  and carries  of lead ballast.

The boat is fitted with a Volvo  or, on later models, a Yanmar 4JH2E  diesel engine for docking and maneuvering.

The design has sleeping accommodation for up to seven people. There is an angled "V" berth in the bow, a double and single settee berth in the main salon and a double berth in the stern, along with a quarter berth. The galley is located at the foot of the companionway steps, on the starboard side. It includes a double sink, a three-burner stove and oven and a top-loading refrigerator. The head is located forward, just aft of the bow cabin, on the starboard side and includes a shower. A navigation station is provided aft, on the port side. Ventilation is provided by two cabin hatches.

The jib is sheeted to short jib tracks. The mainsheet traveler is mounted on the coach house roof, as are three winches. There are also two primary jib winches mounted on the cockpit coamings.

The design has a PHRF racing average handicap of 174.

Operational history
The design was named to the American Sailboat Hall of Fame in 2002. The citation says, in part, "The Pacific Seacraft 37 is a classic American sailboat with an honesty of design that, combined with the highest standards of boatbuilding as attested to by ABS certification for hull and deck construction and CE certification for unlimited offshore use, has shown the sailing industry that there is a place in the hearts and budgets of sailors for a boat created expressly to go to sea and bring the crew back safely."

In a 1994 review Richard Sherwood wrote that the "underwater lines show a very normal fin keel, but the canoe stern is unusual. The cutter rig shown does not indicate stay sails, Maximum beam is aft."

John Kretschmer wrote in a 2008 review for Sailing Magazine, "downwind, the cutter is not particularly efficient, and some type of drifter or cruising spinnaker is necessary to maintain speed in light air. When the wind pipes ups, the 37 finds its stride, even when a large sea is running. Several owners have reported touching double digits while surfing down trade wind seas. Long passages that average better than 150 miles per day are common. However, the most underrated performance factor is seakindliness, as nothing wears out the crew or the gear faster than a quick, pounding motion. The Pacific Seacraft 37 is a "swisher" not a "pounder."".

In a 2011 review in Cruising World, Jeremy McGeary wrote, "it was built as a cutter and as a yawl. I fear the yawl might be a bit busy around the cockpit. I like the cutter rig for its versatility upwind and reaching. I’d dispense with a big genoa and use a modern asymmetric for extra downwind sail area."

See also
List of sailing boat types

Similar sailboats
CS 36
Hinterhoeller F3
Hunter 36 Vision
Nonsuch 36
Portman 36
S2 11.0
Seidelmann 37
Vancouver 36 (Harris)
Watkins 36
Watkins 36C

References

External links

Keelboats
1970s sailboat type designs
Sailing yachts
Boats designed by W. I. B. Crealock
Sailboat types built by Pacific Seacraft
Sailboat types built by  Cruising Consultants Inc.